The Grosne is a  long river in the Rhône and Saône-et-Loire departments in central eastern France. Its source is near Saint-Bonnet-des-Bruyères. It flows generally north. It is a right tributary of the Saône into which it flows in Marnay. Its largest tributaries are the Guye and the Grison.

Departments and communes along its course
This list is ordered from source to mouth: 
Rhône: Saint-Bonnet-des-Bruyères
Saône-et-Loire: Saint-Pierre-le-Vieux, Saint-Léger-sous-la-Bussière, Trambly, Montagny-sur-Grosne, Brandon, Clermain, Mazille, Sainte-Cécile, Jalogny, Cluny, Cortambert, Lournand, Massilly, Bray, Taizé, Ameugny, Cormatin, Malay, Savigny-sur-Grosne, Saint-Gengoux-le-National, Sercy, Bresse-sur-Grosne, Santilly, La Chapelle-de-Bragny, Messey-sur-Grosne, Lalheue, Laives, Saint-Ambreuil, Beaumont-sur-Grosne, Saint-Cyr, Varennes-le-Grand, Marnay

References

Rivers of France
Rivers of Saône-et-Loire
Rivers of Rhône (department)
Rivers of Bourgogne-Franche-Comté
Rivers of Auvergne-Rhône-Alpes